The 2016 LFA season was the inaugural season of the Liga de Fútbol Americano Profesional, the top American football league in Mexico. The regular season began on February 21 and concluded on April 3. The Tazón México I was played on April 10 with the Mayas defeating the Raptors to win the first LFA championship.

News
The Liga de Fútbol Americano Profesional (Professional American Football League) was officially presented on January 12, 2016, by Miguel Ángel Mancera, Head of Government of the Federal District from 2012 to 2018.

Four teams would take part in the first season, all of them, newly created clubs: Condors, Eagles, Mayas and Raptors.

All the games would be played at the Estadio Jesús Martínez "Palillo" of the Magdalena Mixhuca Sports City, including the championship game, the Tazón México I.

Regular season

Structure
Teams played all the opponents twice. At the end of the season, the top two classified teams qualify to the championship game, the Tazón México.

Standings
Note: GP = Games played, W = Wins, L = Losses, PF = Points for, PA = Points against

Teams in bold qualified to the championship game.

Results

Tazón México I

The first edition of the Tazón México was held at the Estadio Jesús Martínez "Palillo" of the Magdalena Mixhuca Sports City. The match was contested by Raptors, who finished second in the league with a 4–2 regular season record, and Mayas, who finished first with the same regular season record as their rivals.

With three receptions for 53 yards, including two touchdowns, Mayas wide receiver Josué Martínez was selected as the most valuable player of the game.

Box score

References

2016 in American football
LFA
LFA seasons